Adam Krieger (7 January 1634 – 30 June 1666) was a German composer. Born in Driesen, Neumark, he studied organ with Samuel Scheidt in Halle. He succeeded Johann Rosenmüller as organist at Leipzig's Nikolaikirche (1655–57) and founded the city's Collegium Musicum before settling for the rest of his career in Dresden.

Krieger composed and versified numerous songs. His fame rests on his pioneering role in the development of the solo Lied. His first collection of songs appeared in 1657; they are marked by simple folk-like melodies. His second collection of Arien (1667) survives and has been edited in vol. 19 of Denkmäler deutscher Tonkunst. His most famous song is "Nun sich der Tag geendet hat" (English: "Now the day has ended"), which may be found in the hymnal of the Lutheran church.

Adam Krieger is unrelated to the later German composers Johann Philipp Krieger and Johann Krieger.

References

External links

1634 births
1666 deaths
17th-century classical composers
German Baroque composers
German classical composers
German male classical composers
People from Drezdenko
People from the Province of Brandenburg
Pupils of Heinrich Schütz
17th-century male musicians